The Surigao del Norte State University, (SNSU) formerly, Surigao State College of Technology, is a public university in the Philippines.  It is mandated to provide advance education, higher technological, professional instruction and training in the fields of agriculture and environment studies, fishery, engineering, forestry, industrial technology, education, law, medicine and other health-related programs, information technology, arts and sciences, and other related courses. It is also mandated to undertake research and extension services, and provide progressive leadership in its areas of specialization.  Its main campus is located in Surigao City.

History 
In 1969, the school was established as Surigao School of Arts and Trades. In 1998, the school was renamed Surigao State College of Technology after it merged with Malimono School of Fisheries.

Elevation to university status 
On June 4, 2013, Surigao del Norte State University was established under Rep. Act 10600, integrating Surigao del Norte State College of Technology with Siargao National College of Science and Technology in Del Carmen and the Surigao del Norte College of Agriculture and Technology in Mainit. The name change is still yet to be implemented after it was amended by RA 11010 that the institution shall retain its status prior to the effectivity of this Act until it is able to comply with CHED requirements.

References

External links
Surigao State College of Technology - Del Carmen Campus

Universities and colleges in Surigao del Norte
State universities and colleges in the Philippines
Schools in Surigao City